"General" Rufus Welch (Sep. 1, 1800-December 5, 1856) was a leading circus impresario in the early-19th century.

Life and career
Welch was born in New Berlin, Chenango County, New York.  He initially was a chairmaker.  In 1827 he started in the zoo business. By 1829 he was running a circus with Erman Handy and they took the circus to Cuba.  For much of the 1830s he was involved in running various menageries. He was part of Purdy, Welch and Macomber, the firm which ran the Boston Zoological Society, showing animals.   These would often have 100 animals.  In 1837 PWZ went out of business and Welch turned to circuses because it required less capital investment. In 1837 he became the manager of the Lion Theatre Circus.  In that year Welch had imported three giraffes from Africa, which were the first of these animals brought to the USA.

Welch leased the National Theatre in Philadelphia. He called his circus the National and at the end of each touring season performed a major show in Philadelphia.

Starting in 1841 he was heavily involved with circuses in Philadelphia.  From this period he not only had animals but also acrobats and clowns in his circuses.

In 1846 Welch joined forces with Dan Rice to run a circus in Philadelphia.

Welch died in 1856 in New York City and is interred at The Woodlands Cemetery in Philadelphia, Pennsylvania.

References

Sources
www.circushistory.org/Olympians/OlympiansC1.htm
G. L. Chindahl. A History of the Circus in America. (Caldwell, Idaho: Caxton Printers, 1959) p. 37-41, 77.

1800 births
Circus owners
1856 deaths
Burials at The Woodlands Cemetery
Businesspeople from Philadelphia
People from New Berlin, New York
19th-century American businesspeople